The 2015–16 season was West Bromwich Albion's sixth consecutive season in the Premier League and their 138th year in existence. This season West Bromwich Albion participated in the Premier League, FA Cup and League Cup. The season covered the period from 1 July 2015 to 30 June 2016.

Background
The writers of the Birmingham Mail forecast that Albion would finish somewhere between 10th and 16th, the average of all their predictions being 13th place. The Guardian also forecast a 13th-place finish for Albion, predicting that Tony Pulis would "be able to drive his side to safety" in his first full season in charge.

The club created a "fanzone", in which up to 2,000 supporters could gather before and after home matches. The fanzone is based in the vicinity of the 19th century
Grade Two listed Hawthorns pub, adjacent to Albion's home ground, The Hawthorns. In order to facilitate this, the wings of the pub building were demolished and the central structure renovated inside and out. The work was initially delayed due to the discovery of horsehair in the building's plaster, which needed to be tested for anthrax spores. Work resumed once the tests came back negative.

Players

First-team squad
Squad at end of season

Left club during season

Statistics

Appearances and goals

|-
! colspan=14 style=background:#dcdcdc; text-align:center| Goalkeepers

|-
! colspan=14 style=background:#dcdcdc; text-align:center| Defenders

|-
! colspan=14 style=background:#dcdcdc; text-align:center| Midfielders

|-
! colspan=14 style=background:#dcdcdc; text-align:center| Forwards

|-
! colspan=14 style=background:#dcdcdc; text-align:center| Players transferred out during the season

Transfers

Transfers in

Total outgoing:  £30,500,000

Transfers out

Total incoming:  £3,000,000

Loans in

Loans out

Pre-season
On 1 May 2015, it was announced that West Bromwich Albion would face Walsall in a pre-season friendly on 28 July 2015. Also announced was that West Bromwich Albion will go on tour to the United States and face Orlando City, Charleston Battery and Richmond Kickers. On 12 May 2015, it was announced that a West Bromwich Albion XI side will travel to Forest Green Rovers on 28 July 2015. On 7 July 2015, West Bromwich Albion announced a friendly fixture against Swindon Town.

Premier League
For the club's final home match of the season, against Liverpool, West Bromwich Albion temporarily installed 96 red seats in the away end of The Hawthorns. Each seat featured the name of one of the victims of the Hillsborough disaster and remained unoccupied throughout the match.

League table

Results summary

Results by matchday

Matches
On 17 June 2015, the fixtures for the forthcoming season were announced.

Cup competitions

FA Cup

League Cup
West Bromwich Albion enter in the second round and were drawn at home against Port Vale. The third round draw was made on 25 August 2015 live on Sky Sports by Charlie Nicholas and Phil Thompson. West Brom were drawn away to Norwich City.

Notes

References

West Bromwich Albion
West Bromwich Albion F.C. seasons